WFOX (95.9 MHz, advertised  on air as "95.9 The Fox") is a radio station broadcasting a mainstream rock format. The station is licensed to Southport, Connecticut, United States, and it serves the Bridgeport area. The station is owned by Connoisseur Media as of May 10, 2013. The WFOX studios are located on Wheelers Farms Road in Milford; the station's transmitter is on Shirley Street in Norwalk.

History
WFOX signed on in 1966 as WDRN.

In April 2006, the current call letters replaced WEFX.

On May 13, 2019, WFOX relaunched its classic rock format with a playlist centered on 1980s-2000s rock.

References

External links

Norwalk, Connecticut
Mass media in Fairfield County, Connecticut
FOX (FM)
Mainstream rock radio stations in the United States
Connoisseur Media radio stations
Radio stations established in 1966
1966 establishments in Connecticut